Gadarene may refer to:

 Of or relating to Gadara, ancient town; ruins at Umm Qais in Jordan
 Miracle of the Gadarene swine, a miracle of Jesus
 Gadarene Lake, Antarctica
 Gadarene Ridge, Antarctica

See also
 Gadara (disambiguation)